Ostlingoceras is an extinct genus of ammonites belonging to the Turrilitidae family.

Species
 Ostlingoceras brandi Young, 1958
 Ostlingoceras conlini Clark, 1955
 Ostlingoceras puzosianum (d'Orbigny, 1842)
 Ostlingoceras rorayensis (Collignon, 1964)

Fossil record
Fossils of Ostlingoceras are found in marine strata of the Cretaceous (age range: from 99.7 to 94.3 million years ago.).  Fossils are known from some localities in Angola, France, Italy, Madagascar, Mozambique, Switzerland, the United Kingdom and United States.

References

Late Cretaceous ammonites of Europe
Late Cretaceous ammonites of North America
Ammonites of Africa
Ammonitida genera
Turrilitoidea